Bijlipur may refer to:

Bijlipur, Punjab, a village in Ludhiana district, Punjab. Nationally noted for best child sex ratio in Punjab
Bijlipur, India, a village in Bihar, India